The Vanuatuan records in swimming are the fastest ever performances of swimmers from Vanuatu, which are recognised and ratified by the Vanuatu Aquatics Federation.

All records were set in finals unless noted otherwise.

Long Course (50 m)

Men

Women

Short Course (25 m)

Men

Women

References

External links
Vanuatu Aquatics Federation

Vanuatu
Records
Swimming